The Vienna Symphony (Vienna Symphony Orchestra) is an Austrian orchestra based in Vienna. Its primary concert venue is the Vienna Konzerthaus. In Vienna, the orchestra also performs at the Musikverein and at the Theater an der Wien.

History
In 1900, Ferdinand Löwe founded the orchestra as the Wiener Concertverein (Vienna Concert Society). In 1913 it moved into the Konzerthaus, Vienna. In 1919 it merged with the Tonkünstler Orchestra. In 1933 it acquired its current name. Despite a lull in concert attendance after the introduction of radio during the 1920s, the orchestra survived until the invasion of Austria in 1938 and became incorporated into the German Culture Orchestras. As such, they were used for purposes of propaganda until, depleted by assignments to work in munitions factories, the orchestra closed down on September 1, 1944.

Their first post-war concert occurred on September 16, 1945, performing Gustav Mahler's Symphony No. 3. Under the direction of Josef Krips, they quickly rebuilt a modern repertoire after ten years of isolation, and travelled to the Bregenz Festival for the first time in the summer of 1946.

That year marked the beginning of the tenure of Herbert von Karajan who, though not principal conductor, worked with the orchestra in the "Karajan Series" concerts, going on extensive tours throughout Europe and North America. In 1959. the orchestra performed for Pope John XXIII at Vatican City, leading up to the debut of Wolfgang Sawallisch.

Sawallisch's leadership saw a tour of the United States in 1964 as well as a combined U.S.-Japan tour in 1967. It also included the re-opening of the Theater an der Wien in 1962. Krips returned as artistic advisor in the interim between Sawallisch's departure and the arrival of Carlo Maria Giulini as principal conductor. In 1986, Georges Prêtre became principal guest conductor, and served until the arrival of Rafael Frühbeck de Burgos as principal conductor in 1991. Vladimir Fedoseyev became chief conductor in 1997 and served in the post until 2005. Prêtre and Sawallisch each held the title of Ehrendirigent (honorary conductor) of the orchestra until their respective deaths. Fabio Luisi was principal conductor from 2005 to 2013.

In October 2011, Philippe Jordan was named the VSO's next chief conductor, effective with the 2014–2015 season, with an initial contract of 5 years In December 2016, the orchestra announced the extension of Jordan's contract as chief conductor through the 2020–2021 season. The orchestra has begun its first CD commercial cycle of recording of the Beethoven symphonies with Jordan. Jordan concluded his tenure as chief conductor at the close of the 2020–2021 season.

Andrés Orozco-Estrada first guest-conducted the VSO in 2006. In March 2018, the VSO announced the appointment of Orozco-Estrada as its next chief conductor, effective with the 2021–2022 season, with an initial contract of 5 years. He is scheduled to take the title of chief conductor designate in the 2020–2021 season.  Following a report that the orchestra had planned not to extend his initial contract, Orozco-Estrada resigned as chief conductor on 12 April 2022, with immediate effect.

Chief conductors

 Ferdinand Löwe (1900–1925)
 Hugo Gottesmann (1929–1933)
 Oswald Kabasta (1934–1938)
 Hans Weisbach (1939–1944)
 Hans Swarowsky (1945–1947)
 Wolfgang Sawallisch (1960–1970)
 Josef Krips (1970–1973; Artistic Director)
 Carlo Maria Giulini (1973–1976)
 Gennady Rozhdestvensky (1980–1982)
 Rafael Frühbeck de Burgos (1991–1996)
 Vladimir Fedoseyev (1997–2005)
 Fabio Luisi (2005–2013)
 Philippe Jordan (2014–2021)
 Andrés Orozco-Estrada (2021–2022)

Other affiliated conductors
 Wilhelm Furtwängler (1927–1930; as director of the Gesellschaft der Musikfreunde)
 Herbert von Karajan (1948–1964; as director of the Gesellschaft der Musikfreunde)
 Georges Pretre (1986–1991; Principal Guest Conductor)

References

External links

 
 

Austrian orchestras
Musical groups established in 1900
Musical groups from Vienna
1900 establishments in Austria